Perry Blake (born 10 May 1970) is an Irish singer and songwriter from Sligo, Ireland, known for the delicate, downtempo, melancholic style of his songs and his soft singing voice.

Career
Blake's 1998 self-titled debut album was successful in the United Kingdom and won critical praise. His first single, "The Hunchback Of San Francisco", came from this album. His second release, Still Life, contained contributions from Steve Jansen, while his third album, California, was co-produced with Italian composer Marco Sabiu and featured Dickon Hinchliffe of Tindersticks and the former Prefab Sprout drummer Neil Conti.

Blake is popular in France, where his music was used for the soundtracks of the films Presque rien (2000, for which he also wrote the original music) and Trois Petites Filles (2004).

Blake's musical influences include Leonard Cohen, David Sylvian, Scott Walker, and Nick Drake. He has collaborated with Françoise Hardy and wrote two songs for her award-winning Tant de belles choses album. He has also worked with French electronic star Émilie Simon.

In June 2014, Blake released an electronic pop album, Modern Love under the name Electro Sensitive Behaviour, with longtime collaborators Glenn Garrett and Graham Murphy, whom he has worked with since his first album in 1998.

Perry is now signed to and managed by Cumbrian-based label Moochin' About.

Discography
Studio albums
Perry Blake (1998) (Polydor)
Still Life (1999) (Naive)
California (2002) (Naive)
Songs for Someone (2004) (Naive)
The Crying Room (2006) (Blu Orchard/Warner France)
 Canyon Songs (2007) (Reekus Records) 
Songs Of Praise (2019) (Moochin' About)
New Years Wish (2020) (Moochin' About)

Live albums
Broken Statues (Live at Cirque Royal, Nuits Botanique, Brussels on 29 September 2000) (2001) (Naive)
Soundtracks
Presque rien (2000) (Naive)
Others
Modern Love (2014) (Orchard-Lily, iTunes release) as Electro Sensitive Behaviour

References

External links
Official website

Concert Photos (The Black Sessions) by Laurent Orseau
Discogs.com entry

1970 births
Living people
Musicians from County Sligo
21st-century Irish  male singers
Naïve Records artists